José Antonio 'Pepito' Ramos Huete (born 3 April 1951) is a retired Spanish footballer who played as a right back and is now a coach.

He spent most of his career in La Liga, amassing 244 appearances during 11 seasons, with Espanyol and Barcelona.

Playing career
Born in Tétouan, Morocco, Ramos moved to Spain at early age and made his senior debuts with CE Mataró in 1969 at the age of 18, in Tercera División. After two seasons as a starter (suffering relegation in his second), he moved straight to La Liga, signing for RCD Espanyol.

Ramos made his debut in the main category of Spanish football on 10 October 1971, coming on as a second-half substitute in a 1–1 home draw against Burgos CF. After being sparingly used in the 1972–73 campaign, he subsequently became an undisputed starter for the Pericos, never appearing in fewer than 25 matches per season.

On 14 July 1976, Ramos moved to cross-town rivals FC Barcelona, for a fee of 30 million pesetas. With the side he started in 1981 Copa del Rey Final, and appeared regularly over the course of five seasons.

In January 1983, Ramos was released by Barcelona and immediately moved to FC Cartagena in Segunda División. After appearing regularly, he retired in the end of the 1982–83 season, aged 31.

International career
On 12 October 1975, Ramos made his debut for Spain, starting in a 2–0 win against Denmark. He appeared in three further matches for the national team, aside from two caps for Catalonia.

Managerial career
Shortly after retiring, Ramos took up coaching and had spells at UE Vic, FC Santboià, Gimnàstic de Tarragona, AEC Manlleu, AE Prat and UE Rubí.

Honours
Barcelona
UEFA Cup Winners' Cup: 1978–79, 1981–82
Copa del Rey: 1977–78, 1980–81

See also
List of Spain international footballers born outside Spain

References

External links
 
 
 National team data at BDFutbol
 
 

1951 births
Living people
People from Tétouan
Moroccan footballers
Spanish footballers
Association football defenders
La Liga players
Segunda División players
Tercera División players
RCD Espanyol footballers
FC Barcelona players
FC Cartagena footballers
Spain amateur international footballers
Spain international footballers
Spanish football managers
Gimnàstic de Tarragona managers
AE Prat managers
CE Mataró players
FC Santboià managers
Footballers from Catalonia
People from Mataró
Sportspeople from the Province of Barcelona
Catalonia international footballers